Hapalothyma is a genus of moths belonging to the family Tineidae.

Species
Hapalothyma ioplocama Meyrick, 1919
Hapalothyma xanthochorda Meyrick, 1919

References

Tineidae
Tineidae genera
Taxa named by Edward Meyrick